Desert pride is a common name for several shrubs native to Australia and may refer to:

Eremophila eriocalyx
Eremophila mackinlayi